The Jardin de la Magalone is public park and garden à la française in the city of Marseille, France.  It is listed by the French Ministry of Culture as one of the Remarkable Gardens of France.

Description
The garden is 1.4 hectares in size, and surrounds an 18th-century bastide, or Provençal manor house.  Two terraces, embellished with fountains representing the Rhône and the Saône Rivers,  separate the house from the garden.  The garden is laid out following the principles of a classical French Garden,  with parterres,  broderie of box wood, statues representing the four seasons,  and two basins.  rows of tulip tree add to the geometric harmony of the garden.  The garden is surrounded by a trees, which shield it from the city. separate it the city.

History
The bastide was begun in the 17th century, then resumed in 1713 and continued during the 18th century.  In 1891 Madame de Ferry, who inherited the property, restored the bastide and commissioned the noted landscape architect Édouard André to create a  modern version of a classic garden. She brought in stone basins, fountains, and statues, five of which came originally from the Château Grignan.

The property was purchased by the city of Marseille in the 1980s.  The bastide now is the home of the Cité de la musique, which organizes concerts and conferences in the bastide and the garden.

External links

 Description on the site of the French Committee of Parks and Gardens

9th arrondissement of Marseille
Buildings and structures in Marseille
Geography of Marseille
Magalone, Jardin de la
Provence
Tourist attractions in Marseille